Lez Zeppelin is an all-female tribute act, performing the work of Led Zeppelin.

History

In June 2005, Chuck Klosterman wrote an article for Spin that featured Lez Zeppelin as a leading protagonist in a trend of all-female hard rock "tribute" bands. He referred to the group as "the most powerful all-female band in rock history" and described the rise of bands like Lez Zeppelin as a "kind of multilayered cultural phenomenon." Stories about the group appeared in The Times, whose journalist called the band "the best new band I’ve seen all year, no question;" Reuters and CNN.com., which ran a front page feature that called the group so "electrifying" they are "driving club audiences to a frenzy."

In April 2007, after touring in the US and Europe the band released its first album, Lez Zeppelin, which was produced by Eddie Kramer, former recording engineer on several Led Zeppelin albums. In the wake of this release, the band was invited at festivals including the Download Festival in the UK; Rock am Ring and Rock im Park in Germany; and the Voodoo Festival in New Orleans.

The announcement in February 2008, that Led Zeppelin would take the stage at the Bonnaroo Festival, was an incorrect report by some news organizations since that was Lez Zeppelin which was due to perform.

Throughout 2008, the group continued to tour in the U.S. and in the late fall made its first visit to Japan to promote the release of its debut record. In March 2009, Lez Zeppelin played a benefit concert in Mumbai. In 2010, the band headed back into the studio to record a second album and released their re-recording of Led Zeppelin I.

The band continued to tour and had several line-up changes in the 2010s, with the EP The Island of Skyros coming out in late 2019.

Members
Marlain Angelides – lead vocals, tambourine, harmonica
Joan Chew – bass guitar, backing vocals, keyboards
Steph Paynes – guitars, backing vocals, acoustic guitar, theremin
Leesa Harrington-Squyres – drums, backing vocals, gong

Former members
Kris Bradley – vocals
Lisa Brigantino – bass guitar, mandolin, keyboards
Shannon Conley – lead vocals, tambourine
Helen Destroy – drums
Jessica Fagre – keyboards
Brooke Gengras – bass guitar
Wendy Kidd – drums
Sarah McLellan – vocals
Megan Thomas – bass guitar, keyboards

Albums

2007: Lez Zeppelin

In late 2007, the band (then consisting of Steph Paynes, Sarah McLellan on vocals, Helen Destroy on drums and Lisa Brigantino on bass and keyboards) recorded its first album containing six Led Zeppelin selections (one song from each of the first six albums) and two originals. The album was recorded at Electric Lady Studios in New York City with producer/engineer Eddie Kramer, best known for his work with Led Zeppelin and Jimi Hendrix, and was mastered by George Marino, who digitally remastered all of the original Led Zeppelin recordings with Jimmy Page. Released on Emanation Records, the album is distributed by Redeye Distribution, and was also released and distributed in Japan by the Avex Music Group. Reviewing the release for AllMusic Guide, Alex Henderson wrote that the album is "worthwhile" and that the musicians "should not be dismissed as a mere novelty act"; the editorial team gave the release 3.5 out of five stars.

"Whole Lotta Love" – 5:44
"The Ocean" – 4:36
"On the Rocks" – 2:14
"Since I've Been Loving You" – 7:58
"Rock 'n Roll" – 3:52
"Winter Sun" – 2:41
"Communication Breakdown" – 2:43
"Kashmir" – 8:42

2010: Lez Zeppelin I

In 2010, the group (consisting of Steph Paynes, Leesa Harrington-Squyres, Megan Thomas, and Shannon Conley) returned to the studio to record a second album with producers Perry Margouleff and William Wittman that serves as a replication of Led Zeppelin’s 1969 debut. The album was recorded at Pie Studios in Glen Cove, New York, using all of the same analog gear and recording techniques, as well as the same vintage equipment used by Led in 1968. Released on Pie Records, the album is distributed by Redeye Distribution in the U.S. and was also released and distributed in Japan by the Avex Music Group. AllMusic Guide gave this album three out of five stars, with reviewer Stephen Thomas Erlewine writing that the tone and musicianship are correct but "ultimately it’s not much more than excellent advertising for their live gigs".

Track listing
"Good Times Bad Times" (Jimmy Page, John Paul Jones, and John Bonham)
"Babe I'm Gonna Leave You" (Anne Bredon/Jimmy Page, Robert Plant)
"You Shook Me" (Willie Dixon, J.B. Lenoir)
"Dazed and Confused" (Jimmy Page, inspired by Jake Holmes)
"Your Time Is Gonna Come" (Jimmy Page, John Paul Jones)
"Black Mountain Side" (Jimmy Page)
"Communication Breakdown" (Jimmy Page, John Paul Jones, John Bonham)
"I Can't Quit You Baby" (Willie Dixon)
"How Many More Times" (Jimmy Page, John Paul Jones, John Bonham)

2019: The Island of Skyros
In 2015, the band released the "Mystic Snowman" single, which is a Christmas-themed re-write of "Stairway to Heaven" with "Frosty the Snowman". The band followed it with their 2019 album recorded with a string section.

"Battle of Evermore" – 5:46
"Achilles Last Stand" – 9:53
"Rain Song" – 7:40
"Immigrant Song" – 2:22
"Friends" – 4:18
"In the Light" – 9:24

References

External links

Lez Zeppelin at Billboard
Steph Paynes Interview-Artist Connection Podcast

2004 establishments in New York City
All-female tribute bands
Led Zeppelin tribute bands
Musical groups established in 2004
Musical groups from New York City
Musical quartets
Rock music groups from New York (state)